This is a list of earthquakes that have occurred in the Italian seismic district of Irpinia since the 15th century. It comprises all of the significant earthquakes whose epicenter was located in Irpinia, not those whose epicenter was outside the area, but may have still have an effect on it. The death toll includes the total number of deaths as a result of the earthquake, not only those that occurred in Irpinia.

Earthquakes

See also 
List of earthquakes in Italy
List of historical earthquakes

References 

Irpinia
Apennine Mountains
History of Campania
Italy history-related lists
Irpinia